HMS Encounter was an E-class destroyer built for the Royal Navy in the early 1930s. Although assigned to the Home Fleet upon completion, the ship was attached to the Mediterranean Fleet in 1935–36 during the Abyssinia Crisis. During the Spanish Civil War of 1936–39, she spent considerable time in Spanish waters, enforcing the arms blockade imposed by Britain and France on both sides of the conflict. Encounter was assigned to convoy escort and anti-submarine patrol duties in the Western Approaches, when World War II began in September 1939. She participated in the Norwegian Campaign before joining Force H in mid-1940 and was present during the Battles of Dakar and Cape Spartivento later that year. The ship was transferred to the Mediterranean Fleet in 1941 where she escorted convoys to Malta.

Encounter was badly damaged while refitting at Malta a few weeks after arriving in the Mediterranean and was briefly reassigned to Force H after her repairs were completed before rejoining the Mediterranean Fleet later in the year. Late in the year, the ship was transferred to the Eastern Fleet at Singapore and spent several months in early 1942 on convoy escort duties under the control of American-British-Dutch-Australian Command (ABDACOM). She was one of the Allied ships retasked to intercept Japanese invasion convoys during the Dutch East Indies Campaign in February 1942 and participated in the Battle of the Java Sea. Encounter was sunk a few days later in the Second Battle of the Java Sea on 1 March and most of her crew were rescued by a Japanese ship the next day. About a quarter of them died in captivity before the end of the war in 1945. The ship's wreck was discovered in 2007 and had been almost totally destroyed by illegal salvagers by 2016.

Description
The E-class ships were slightly improved versions of the preceding D class. They were powered by two Parsons geared steam turbines, each driving one propeller shaft, using steam provided by three Admiralty three-drum boilers. The ships' complement was 145 officers and ratings.

The ships mounted four 4.7-inch (120 mm) Mark IX guns in single mounts. For anti-aircraft (AA) defence, they had two quadruple mounts for the Vickers  AA machinegun. The E class was fitted with two above-water quadruple mounts for  torpedoes. One depth charge rail and two throwers were fitted; 20 depth charges were originally carried, but this increased to 35 shortly after the war began. By April 1941, the after bank of torpedo tubes had been replaced with a QF 12-pounder 20-cwt anti-aircraft gun, the after mast and funnel being cut down to improve the gun's field of fire. It is uncertain if Encounter had radar fitted before she was transferred to the Far East, but a Type 286 surface-search set was the most likely type to be installed.

Construction and career
Encounter, the sixth ship of that name to serve with the Royal Navy, was ordered 1 November 1932, from Hawthorn Leslie & Company at Hebburn under the 1931 Naval Programme. She was laid down 15 March 1932, and launched on 29 March 1934. The ship was commissioned on 2 November 1934, at a total cost of £252,250, excluding government-furnished equipment like the armament. Encounter and her sister ships were assigned to the 5th Destroyer Flotilla (DF) and accompanied the Home Fleet during its West Indies cruise between January and March 1935. The ship was attached to the Mediterranean Fleet, together with most of the rest of her flotilla, beginning in September 1935, during the Abyssinian Crisis. She collided with another of her sisters, on 19 November during a night exercise off Alexandria. While not severely damaged, Encounter was repaired at Malta from 29 November to 8 February 1936 and returned home with the rest of her sisters the next month. The flotilla patrolled Spanish waters in the Bay of Biscay during the Spanish Civil War, enforcing the edicts of the Non-Intervention Committee, in January–March 1937. The ship's bow was badly damaged in another collision on 26 September 1938 and she was repaired at Hebburn beginning the following day. Her repairs lasted through October and then Encounter was attached to the Mediterranean Fleet on non-intervention patrol duties from Gibraltar for the first three months of 1939. The ship began a refit on 15 July, but it was interrupted by the rise of tensions before the start of World War II in September. She was assigned to the 12th DF upon recommissioning and manned with a crew that largely consisted of reservists.

World War II
Encounter was assigned to convoy escort duties in the Western Approaches Command for the first three months of the war before transferring to Scapa Flow and joining the Home Fleet. At the beginning of the Norwegian Campaign, the ship, together with the destroyer , escorted the oil tanker  to Flakstadøya in the Lofoten Islands on 12 April where a refuelling and repair base was being set up to support British naval operations in northern Norway. On 1 May, she rescued the crew of a shot-down Junkers Ju 87 "Stuka" dive bomber from the water. Two weeks later, the ship rescued a pilot who had run out of fuel near Ankenes on 14 May.

She was refitted at Sheerness Dockyard from 20 June to 20 July and was then transferred to Gibraltar to join the 13th DF of Force H. En route, she escorted several troop ships and the aircraft carrier . During Operation Hurry, Encounter and three other destroyers escorted Argus to a position south-west of Sardinia so the carrier could fly off her Hawker Hurricane fighters to Malta on 2 August. On 13 September, Force H rendezvoused with a convoy that was carrying troops intended to capture Dakar from the Vichy French. Ten days later, they attacked Dakar, but failed to take the city. The ship escorted the battleship  and the cruisers  and  during Operation Coat in early November as they joined the Mediterranean Fleet and then participated in the inconclusive Battle of Cape Spartivento on 27 November during Operation Collar.

1941
After escorting the carrier  to Freetown, Sierra Leone, and Takoradi, Ghana, in January 1941, Encounter rejoined Force H in time to participate in Operation Picket at the end of the month. This was an unsuccessful night torpedo attack by eight of Ark Royals Fairey Swordfish on the Tirso Dam in Sardinia. The British ships returned to Gibraltar on 4 February and began preparing for Operation Grog, a naval bombardment of Genoa, that was successfully carried out five days later. The ship was then transferred to the South Atlantic for escort duties for a time before departing to join the Mediterranean Fleet at Alexandria on 14 April. While refitting in a drydock in Malta, Encounter was damaged by blast and splinters when a bomb detonated on the floor of the dock during an air raid on 29 April. Another bomb struck the ship's forecastle the next day and blew a hole in the hull. She was hit by another bomb on 16 May that blew another hole in the hull and disabled her boilers and cruising turbines when water flooded in through the hull. Repairs took until July to complete, in time for the ship to participate in Operation Substance, during which she escorted six empty freighters from Malta to Gibraltar, 23–26 July. A few days later, she escorted reinforcements to Malta during Operation Style.

The ship was reassigned to the South Atlantic Command for the month of September before rejoining the Mediterranean Fleet in Alexandria on 16 October. She spent most of the next month escorting convoys to Tobruk. Hero and Encounter came alongside and rescued her crew and passengers before Latonas magazine exploded. Encounter was transferred to the Eastern Fleet the following month and departed Alexandria on 14 November bound for Singapore. En route, she rendezvoused with the battleship  and the battlecruiser  of Force Z at Colombo, Ceylon, on 28 November. The ships arrived at their destination on 2 December.

Encounter required a refit upon her arrival and was thus unavailable when Force Z sortied on 8 December on their ill-fated attempt to intercept the Japanese invasion convoys. Four days later, the ship escorted a convoy from Singapore to the Sunda Strait. She remained based at Singapore until 20 January 1942 when she was transferred to the 7th DF of the China Force. Under the command of ABDACOM, the force was tasked with escorting convoys to and from Singapore and the Dutch East Indies. Encounter continued to escort convoys until late February.

First Battle of the Java Sea

On 25 February, Vice Admiral Conrad Helfrich of the Royal Netherlands Navy, the new commander of Allied naval forces in the East Indies, ordered all available warships to join the Dutch Rear Admiral Karel Doorman's Eastern Striking Force at Surabaya. After they had arrived the following day, Doorman's entire force of five cruisers and nine destroyers departed Surabaya at 18:30 to patrol off Eastern Java in hopes of intercepting the oncoming invasion convoy which had been spotted earlier that morning. The Japanese were further north than he anticipated and his ships found nothing. His own ships were located at 09:35 on the following morning, 27 February, and were continuously tracked by the Japanese. Doorman ordered a return to Surabaya at 10:30 and his ships were attacked by eight bombers from the Kanoya Air Group at 14:37. They claimed to have made two hits on Jupiter, but actually missed the British destroyer. Just as his leading ships were entering harbour, he received reports of Japanese ships  to the north and Doorman ordered his ships to turn about to intercept them.

Aware of Doorman's movements, the Japanese commander, Rear Admiral Takeo Takagi, detached the convoy's two escorting destroyer flotillas, each consisting of a light cruiser and seven destroyers, to intercept the Allied ships in conjunction with his own pair of heavy cruisers, ( and ), which were escorted by a pair of destroyers. His heavy cruisers opened fire at long range at 15:47 with little effect. All of these torpedoes failed to damage their targets, although one torpedo hit Exeter and failed to detonate at 16:35. Three minutes later, Haguro changed the course of the battle when one of her shells detonated in Exeter'''s forward boiler room, knocking six of her boilers off-line. The ship sheered out of line to avoid another torpedo and slowed, followed by all of the trailing cruisers. Perth laid a smoke screen to protect Exeter and the Allied ships sorted themselves into separate groups as they attempted to disengage. Exeter was escorted by one Dutch and all three British destroyers in one group and the other cruisers and the American destroyers formed the other group. The Japanese did not initially press their pursuit as they maneuvered to use their torpedoes against the crippled Exeter, which could only make , and her escorts.

On the other hand, Asagumo was damaged by Electra, but the Japanese ship sank the British destroyer at 17:46. Exeter continued south to Surabaya, escorted by Encounter and the Dutch destroyer . Doorman's repeated unsuccessful, and ultimately fatal, attempts to reach the transports concentrated the Japanese on the task of protecting the transports and allowed the damaged British cruiser to reach harbour.

Second Battle of the Java Sea

The following day, after making temporary repairs and refuelling, Exeter, Encounter and the American destroyer  were ordered to sail to Colombo, via the Sunda Strait. About 08:00, the British ships spotted two of the Japanese cruisers, one of which launched its spotting floatplanes. Two others were seen closing in, and both launched their aircraft before opening fire at about 09:30. The Allied ships laid smoke and turned away to the east with the Japanese to their north and south. Exeter was able to reach a speed of  before the first hit on her again detonated in a boiler room and knocked out all power around 11:20. Encounter turned back to lay a smoke screen to protect the immobilised cruiser, and aid survivors, but she was soon immobilised herself by shell hits and splinters and set on fire. Lieutenant Commander Eric Morgan, the destroyer's captain, ordered the ship scuttled to prevent her capture by the Japanese. She capsized and sank about 12:10. Pope initially escaped this melee, only to be sunk about two hours later as well.

The Encounter survivors had been adrift for some 20 hours, in rafts and lifejackets or clinging to floats, many coated in oil and unable to see. Among the rescued was Lieutenant (later Sir) Sam Falle, an officer aboard Encounter, who would go on to become a British diplomat. This humanitarian decision by Lieutenant Commander Shunsaku Kudō placed Ikazuchi'' at risk of submarine attack, and interfered with her fighting ability due to the sheer numbers of rescued sailors. The action was later the subject of a book and a TV special. 38 of the ship's crew subsequently died in captivity.

During an expedition to survey the site in 2016, it was found to have been almost completely destroyed by illegal salvage operations.

Notes

Citations

Bibliography
 
 
 
 
 
 
 
 
 
 
 
 
 
 
 
 
 
 
 

 

E and F-class destroyers of the Royal Navy
Ships built on the River Clyde
1934 ships
World War II destroyers of the United Kingdom
World War II shipwrecks in the Java Sea
Maritime incidents in March 1942